Once Again It's Christmas is a holiday album, the 28th and final studio album by Kenny Rogers. It features such musical acts as Alison Krauss, Winfield's Locket and Jennifer Nettles.  As of January 2016, 34,900 copies were sold in the United States.

Track listing

Personnel 

 Kenny Rogers – lead vocals
 Pat Coil – acoustic piano (1, 3, 4, 8), Rhodes (2), synthesizers (2, 11), Hammond B3 organ (5, 6, 11)
 John Hobbs – Rhodes (1, 3–6, 8), acoustic piano (2, 11), synthesizers (4)
 Matt Rollings – acoustic piano (7)
 Jim Brickman – acoustic piano (10)
 Troy Welstad – Hammond B3 organ (10)
 Steve Sundholm – programming (10)
 Brent Mason – electric guitar (1-6, 11)
 John Willis – acoustic guitar (1-8, 11)
 Bryan Sutton – acoustic guitar (2, 5, 7), mandocello (4)
 Randy Dorman – electric guitar (8)
 Tim Ellis – acoustic guitar (10), electric guitar (10)
 Keith Sommers – electric guitar (10)
 Russ Pahl – pedal steel guitar (2, 5)
 Paul Brainard – pedal steel guitar (10)
 Viktor Krauss – bass (1-8, 11)
 Colby Hendricks – bass (10)
 Steve Brewster – drums (2-6, 8, 11)
 Mike Braun – drums (10)
 Eric Darken – percussion (1, 5, 7, 8, 11)
 Pat Bergeson – harmonica (1)
 Denis Solee – tenor saxophone (6)
 George Tidwell – trumpet (6)
 Warren Hartman – arrangements (1-7, 9, 11)
 Larry Hall – orchestra (2, 3, 4, 7, 8, 11), orchestral arrangements (3, 4, 7, 8)
 Bergen White – orchestral arrangements (2, 11), harmony vocal arrangements (4) 
 Darren Rust – arrangements (9)
 Ted Sampson – additional vocal concept arrangement (11)
 Winfield's Locket – vocals (2)
 Jennifer Nettles – vocals (3)
 Alison Krauss – vocals (7)
 Home Free – vocals (9)

Harmony vocals

 Tania Hancheroff (1, 4, 5, 6, 11)
 Mark Ivey (1, 4, 11)
 Shane McConnell (1, 4, 11)
 Lisa Silver (1, 4, 11)
 Kira Small (1, 4, 11)
 Bergen White (1, 4, 11)
 Perry Coleman (2, 5)
 Vicki Hampton (5, 6)
 Cindy Walker (5, 6)
 Rachel Hamar (10)
 Michelle Sundholm (10)
 Steve Sundholm (10)

Production 
 Producers – Warren Hartman and Kyle Lehning (Tracks 1-8 & 11); Darren Rust and Steve Sundholm (Track 9); Jim Brickman (Track 10).
 A&R Direction – Rebekah Gordon, Jason Henke and Cris Lacy.
 Production Coordination – Paige Connors
 Recorded by Casey Wood (Tracks 1-8 & 11) and Darren Rust (Track 9).
 Assistant Recording – Chris Ashburn, Shawn Daugherty, Justin Francis and Jason Mott (Tracks 1-8 & 11); Jordan Lehning (Track 9).
 Additional Recording on Tracks 1-8 & 11 – Kevin Sokolnicki
 Vocal Recording on Tracks 1-8 & 11 – Jordan Lehning and Kevin Sokolnicki
 Recorded at Blackbird Studios, The Compound and Soundstage Studios (Nashville, TN); Skyland Studios (Lakeville, MN); Kung Fu Bakery (Portland, OR).
 Digital Editing on Tracks 1-8 & 11 – Jordan Lehning
 Mixing – Kyle Lehning at The Compound (Tracks 1-8 & 11); Darren Rust at Skyland Studios (Lakeville, MN; Track 9); Steve Sundholm at Kung Fu Bakery (Portland, OR; Track 10).
 Mastered by Hank Williams at MasterMix (Nashville, TN).
 Art Direction and Design – Katherine Petillo
 Creative Director – Shane Tarleton
 Photography – Piper Ferguson
 Cover Photography – Kenny Rogers
 Management – Bob Burwell, Jason Henke and Ken Levitan at Vector  Management.
 Business Management – Kevin Dalton and Dwight Wiles at Smith Wiles & Co.
 Brand  Management – Lisa Ray
 Booking – Greg Oswald at WME Entertainment

Chart performance

Weekly charts

Year-end charts

References

2015 Christmas albums
Albums produced by Kyle Lehning
Christmas albums by American artists
Country Christmas albums
Kenny Rogers albums
Warner Records albums